Yousef Gamal El-Din (born October 15, 1985) is an Egyptian-Swiss news anchor and author. Since 2016, he was the host of Bloomberg Television's Bloomberg Markets: Middle East. Previously he worked for CNBC, gaining global TV recognition as the host of CNBC's Access: Middle East and also the channel's regional correspondent, based in Dubai. Previously, Gamal El-Din was a co-host of CNBC's Capital Connection from the network's Middle East studios in Bahrain.

Biography

Gamal El-Din graduated from the American University in Cairo, summa cum laude, in 2007, majoring in Journalism and Mass Communication. He went on to receive a Master of Arts degree in the same field. In addition to outstanding academic achievement, he was awarded the prestigious Ahmed H. Zewail Prize for Excellence in the Sciences and Humanities. Gamal El-Din describes himself as a 'car enthusiast' on his Twitter page and used to be seen frequently at the Bahrain International Circuit.

Career
After a short off-screen stint with OTV as a scriptwriter, Yousef Gamal El-Din joined Nile TV as an English presenter and reporter in July 2007. He made his debut on the "Top Stories" on July 17, 2007, and thereafter anchored the news regularly at the top of the hour live from Cairo. He reported on major events across Egypt and interviewed a wide range of prominent ministers, activists and experts. He also covered Wikimania 2008 and interviewed Jimmy Wales for Egyptian Television.
In July 2008, he took charge of the bi-weekly political program the News Hour. Later in September, Gamal El-Din began hosting the new Business World show. He also made occasional appearances on Yas3ad Saba7ak on Channel 2.

CNBC 

Gamal El-Din joined CNBC in June 2010 as the first anchor based at the channel's newly opened Bahrain bureau, which is operated under the auspices of CNBC Europe. On June 14, 2010 he became the third co-host of Capital Connection, joining Anna Edwards in London and Chloe Cho in Singapore. To this day he remains one of the youngest talents to have joined in the network's history.

During the 2011 Egyptian Revolution, CNBC added extensive coverage of the turmoil and violence. Yousef Gamal El-Din, reporting live for the network and MSNBC during the height of the protests in Tahrir Square, was heard "urging protesters to leave him alone so that he could report". Anchors urged him to "stay safe" only minutes after the Battle of the Camel broke out. CNBC has described him as reporting under "the toughest of circumstances".

Gamal El-Din returned to Cairo several times since the beginning of the revolution to cover protests, and interviewed the Egyptian Interim Prime Minister Essam Sharaf only hours before July 8 “Friday of Determination” demonstration. He also reported on the Bahraini uprising, the 2011 Jordanian protests and the 2011 Turkish general election

On July 4, 2012, Gamal El-Din debuted Access: Middle East, a primetime series giving key insights on regional economic and business developments. The show has featured several billionaires, including Güler Sabancı

Outside of day-to-day programming, Gamal El-Din is frequently at key summits of the World Economic Forum and has moderated sessions at events such as the Abu Dhabi Media Summit and the DIFC Forum.

Post-CNBC

On March 10, 2015, Gamal El-Din announced his resignation via Twitter, deciding to "pursue new opportunities" after five years at CNBC, without elaborating further. Almost six months later, on August 2, 2015, he announced the launch of "Medialitera", an executive media consultancy based out of Dubai.

Awards and Popular Culture

 The Future of Egyptian Television, Enigma Magazine, October 2008

Bibliography

References

External links
 Official Website
 Official biography

Living people
1985 births
Egyptian journalists
Swiss television journalists
The American University in Cairo alumni